Heinäluoma is a Finnish surname. Notable people with the surname include:

Eero Heinäluoma (born 1955), Finnish politician
Eveliina Heinäluoma (born 1988), Finnish politician

Finnish-language surnames